The Tokyo Sports Film Award for Best Director is an award given at the Tokyo Sports Film Award.

List of winners

References

External links
 

Awards established in 1991
Japanese film awards
Recurring events established in 1991
1991 establishments in Japan
Tokyo Sports Film Award
Lists of films by award
Awards for best director